Houchin's Ferry Road is a secondary roadway located in Edmonson County in west-central Kentucky. County road logs list this road as CR-1004 and CR-1005.

Most of the road is maintained by the National Park Service, but portions of the road outside of Mammoth Cave National Park are being maintained by the Edmonson County Road Department.

Road description
The road's southern end is located just southeast of downtown Brownsville at a junction with South Main Street (KY 70/259). A trailblazer sign for the local library stands at the intersection with Ferguson Street. Houchin's Ferry Road passes by the edges of the campus of Edmonson County High School and provides school access points to the parking lots which connects Wildcat Way.

After passing the high school, Houchin's Ferry Road enters the western part of the Mammoth Cave National Park. This is the only road that goes through the western half of the park. It would cross the Green River via a river ferry.  The ferry crossing features a campground, boat ramp, as well as a picnic area.

The road continues as a gravel road at a point north of the ferry. It then travels northeast to cross a number of horseback and hiking trails. After crossing First Creek Trail and J. Skaggs Road (formerly Ollie Ridge Road, which access the Great Onyx Job Corps Center), the road becomes "Ollie Road."

Ollie Road continues northeast past a few residences before ending at an intersection with Kentucky Route 728 right near the KY 728/1827 split near Demunbruns Store and Lincoln communities, which are located east of the Nolin Lake State Park area.

History
Houchin's Ferry/Ollie Road has long been the most direct route linking Brownsville to areas in northeastern Edmonson County. Some residents of northeastern Edmonson County had long commuted from the to Brownsville by way of the ferry. But there were frequent instances in which the ferry was closed down due to either excessively high river levels, low river levels, federal government sequesters and shutdowns.

In 2013, Houchin's Ferry was closed and put on a hiatus due to various reasons, which caused a hardship on commutes between Brownsville and the Lincoln-Ollie-Demunbruns Store area. The fire department in Lincoln held a town hall-style meeting regarding the closing of the ferry, and citizens of Edmonson County were asked to call their congressmen and register their concerns about it. Many of Edmonson County's local officials attended that meeting. The ferry was declared out-of-service in October 2013 as part of the 2013 government shutdown. The failure of Green River Lock and Dam Number 6 made the closure permanent as it caused river levels to sink so low, that the ferry could not operate safely. The closure of Houchin's Ferry was the first Edmonson County-area ferry to go out of business in more than 43 years; the first being the Bear Creek Ferry southwest of Segal being shut down sometime in 1969. The Green River Ferry, further upstream, is now the only ferry in Edmonson County and the Mammoth Cave National Park area to remain in operation. Plans now call to repurpose the Houchins Ferry day-use area for other purposes.

Points of interest
Houchins Ferry Campground
Edmonson County High School Greenhouse and Baseball field
Edmonson County High School (via Wildcat Way and the parking lots)
Edmonson County Public Library (via Ferguson Street)

Major intersections
The entire road is in Edmonson County.

See also

References

External links
Edmonson County Tourism Commission
Mammoth Cave National Park - NPS.gov
Houchin Ferry - Profile by KYTC
Photo of Houchins Ferry (via AroundGuides.com)

Mammoth Cave National Park
Transportation in Edmonson County, Kentucky